Ceajer Chan Ka-keung (Traditional Chinese: 陳家強) GBS JP (born 1957), also referred to as KC Chan, is the former Secretary for Financial Services and the Treasury in the Government of Hong Kong. He is also the ex officio chairman of the Kowloon-Canton Railway Corporation, and an ex officio member of the Hong Kong International Theme Parks board of directors. He left the government and rejoined the Hong Kong University of Science and Technology in 2017.

Education
He holds a bachelor's degree in economics awarded by Wesleyan University, followed by an MBA and a Ph.D. in finance from the University of Chicago.

Career
Chan taught for nine years at Max M. Fisher College of Business in Ohio State University. In 1993 he was named Dean of Business/Management and Professor of Finance at the Hong Kong University of Science and Technology.

Before joining the government, Chan held several public service positions including chairman of the Consumer Council and director of the Hong Kong Futures Exchange. He was also a member of the Exchange Fund Advisory Committee.

He joined the government on 1 July 2007 when he was appointed as the Secretary for Financial Services and the Treasury by Donald Tsang.

List of publications
Chan, K.C., Karolyi, G.A. & Stulz, R.M., "Global financial markets and the risk premium on U.S. equity", Journal of Financial Economics 32 (2), 1992, pp. 137–167
Chan, K.C., Chen, N. & Hsieh, D.A., "An exploratory investigation of the firm size effect", Journal of Financial Economics 14 (3), 1985, pp. 451–47

References

External links
Professor K.C. Chan biodata from the Hong Kong government

1957 births
Living people
Government officials of Hong Kong
Alumni of King's College, Hong Kong
Academic staff of the Hong Kong University of Science and Technology
Wesleyan University alumni
University of Chicago Booth School of Business alumni
Kowloon-Canton Railway Corporation
Chan, K. C.
Recipients of the Silver Bauhinia Star
Members of the Election Committee of Hong Kong, 2021–2026
Ohio State University faculty